Episcopal Church of the Redeemer may refer to:

Episcopal Church of the Redeemer (Avon Park, Florida)
Episcopal Church of the Redeemer (Cannon Falls, Minnesota)
Episcopal Church of the Redeemer (Salmon, Idaho)
Church of the Redeemer, Amman, Jordan

See also
 Church of the Redeemer (disambiguation)